Cherukad Award is an annual award given for literary works in Malayalam. The award was instituted in 1978 by Cherukad Smaraka Trust at Perinthalmanna, Kerala, India. It is named after Malayalam playwright, poet, novelist, and political activist Cherukad Govinda Pisharodi. The award comprises ₹25,000 and a citation.

List of awardees

References

Indian literary awards
Awards established in 1978
Malayalam literary awards
1978 establishments in Kerala
Kerala awards